Albert Schaff (8 April 1885 – 21 April 1968) was a French footballer. He played in one match for the France national football team in 1914.

References

External links
 

1885 births
1968 deaths
French footballers
France international footballers
Footballers from Paris
Association football forwards